Phyllotreta albionica, the cabbage flea beetle, is a species of flea beetle in the family Chrysomelidae. It is found in Central America and North America.

Subspecies
These two subspecies belong to the species Phyllotreta albionica:
 Phyllotreta albionica albionica
 Phyllotreta albionica corusca Chittenden

References

Further reading

 
 

Alticini
Articles created by Qbugbot
Beetles described in 1857